Tremain Ferrell Mack (born November 21, 1974), also known as T-Mack, is a retired professional American football player in the National Football League (NFL). He played four years for the Cincinnati Bengals, primarily as a return specialist. In 1998, he finished second in the AFC, with 1,165 yards on 45 returns. He was later selected to the 2000 Pro Bowl.

Mack retired as the Bengals all-time leader in kick return yards with 3,583.

Mack is currently the head coach of the Mount Rainier High School Rams.

Early years
Mack was born in Tyler, Texas and attended Chapel Hill High School. After graduating, he was drafted by the Kansas City Royals. From 1993–1996, he attended the University of Miami where he played football, baseball and was on the track team.

Professional career
Mack was selected in the 4th round (111th overall) by the Cincinnati Bengals where he played for four seasons. As a rookie, he started four games and recorded one interception. In his second season, he became the team's primary return specialist, recording 1,165 return yards for the season. In 1999, he recorded a career high 1,382 return yards and earned a trip to the 1999 Pro Bowl along with teammate Corey Dillon. In 2000, Mack recorded 1,036 return yards in his final NFL season.

After three years out of football, Mack spent one season with the Louisville Fire of af2. That was followed by two season with the San Jose Sabercats of the Arena Football League (AFL). He set the AFL rookie record for consecutive Defensive Player of the Week honors.

Coaching career
Mack is currently the head coach of the Mount Rainier High School Rams.

References

External links
 Mount Rainer coaching profile

1974 births
Living people
American football return specialists
American football safeties
Cincinnati Bengals players
Miami Hurricanes football players
American Conference Pro Bowl players
High school football coaches in Washington (state)
Sportspeople from Tyler, Texas
Players of American football from Texas
African-American coaches of American football
African-American players of American football
21st-century African-American sportspeople
20th-century African-American sportspeople